Euparagia is a genus of wasps in the family Vespidae, the only extant genus in the subfamily Euparagiinae.

Species
The following species are classified within the genus Euparagia:

 Euparagia boregoensis Bohart, 1948
 Euparagia desertorum Bohart, 1948
 Euparagia maculiceps (Cameron, 1904)
 Euparagia platiniceps Bohart, 1938
 Euparagia richardsi  Bohart & Krombein 1979
 Euparagia scutellaris Cresson, 1879
 Euparagia siccata Bohart, 1988
 Euparagia timberlakei Bohart, 1948
 Euparagia unidentata  Carpenter & Kimsey, 1988 
 Euparagia yuma Bohart, 1988

Biology
Euparagia wasps are little known and the biology of only one species, Euparagia scutellaris, is known, and the females provision nests in the soil with weevil larvae.

References

Vespidae
Taxa named by Ezra Townsend Cresson